The 2019 European Athletics U23 Championships were the 12th edition of the biennial athletics competition between European athletes under the age of twenty-three. It was held in Gävle, Sweden from 11 to 14 July.

Medal summary

Men

Track

* Medalists who participated in heats only.

Field

Combined

Women

Track

Field

Combined

Medal table

Participation
1039 athletes from 50 nations competed at this edition.

 (1)
 (1)
 (1)
 (14)
 (13)
 (1)
 (28)
 (23)
 (5)
 (8)
 (10)
 (5)
 (33)
 (12)
 (10)
 (43)
 (75)
 (3)
 (55)
 (54)
 (27)
 (30)
 (3)
 (38)
 (9)
 (67)
 (1)
 (16)
 (1)
 (13)
 (2)
 (3)
 (4)
 (1)
 (1)
 (22)
 (1)
 (25)
 (51)
 (31)
 (27)
 (1)
 (11)
 (10)
 (9)
 (45)
 (50)
 (33)
 (58)
 (54)

References

External links

Results Book

 
European Athletics U23 Championships
International athletics competitions hosted by Sweden
2019 in Swedish sport
European Athletics U23 Championships
European Athletics U23 Championships
European Athletics U23 Championships
Sports competitions in Gävle